The Brides of March is an annual event that takes place in San Francisco, California and other cities around March 15. Started by the Cacophony Society, the event's name is a pun on the term Ides of March, and is a parody of weddings in western culture. The event, which began in 1999, is part pub crawl and part street theater, while wearing a thrift store wedding dress. 

Brides may be of any gender, but the wearing of traditional white wedding dresses, or something resembling them, is the point of the event. In recent years there have been a greater number of gothic brides who wear black, alien brides and other variations on the theme. 

Like its Cacophony Society counterpart "Santarchy", the tradition has spread worldwide and now includes gatherings in Austin, Boston, Los Angeles, 
New York City, Reno, 
Phoenix (started in 2008), Portland, Seattle,Vegas, London, and Japan, among others.

References

External links 
 Austin Brides of March
 London Brides of March
 Seattle Brides of March
 Brides of March official web site
 The San Francisco Cacophony Society home page

Pub crawls
Culture of San Francisco
Cacophony Society
1999 establishments in California